is a type of Japanese porcelain traditionally from Tobe, Ehime, western Japan. It is of the sometsuke (染付) blue and white pottery type.

The ware started making its appearance when Katō Yasutoki, 9th lord of the Ōzu Domain (1769–1787), started hiring potters from Hizen. Production of white porcelain (hakuji) commenced in An'ei 6 (1777).

In 1976 it was officially designated by the government as a traditional crafts.

The products are characterized by a slightly thick, rugged base and fine brush strokes.

References

External links 

 http://www.tobeyaki.co.jp 
 https://www.google.com/culturalinstitute/beta/exhibit/3QICOxLMD1UkIQ

Culture in Ehime Prefecture
Japanese porcelain
Tobe, Ehime